Credit Valley Conservation (CVC) is one of 36 conservation authorities in Ontario, Canada, responsible for protecting, restoring, and managing natural resources at the watershed level. CVC operates within the Credit River watershed and smaller adjacent watersheds that drain directly into Lake Ontario, as well as along a section of the Lake Ontario shoreline. Together, these areas make up CVC's jurisdiction. CVC is a member of Conservation Ontario.

CVC works in partnership with municipal governments, schools, businesses, and community organizations to deliver locally based environmental programs.

CVC receives its funding from municipal sources, as well as grants and donations made to the Credit Valley Conservation Foundation, self-generated user fees, and other service fees. CVC was founded in 1954 when much of the Credit River watershed was used for rural agriculture and pasture. Since then, there has been rapid urban development within the southern portion of the Credit River watershed, within the municipal boundaries of Mississauga and Brampton.

Conservation Areas
Credit Valley Conservation operates 11 conservation areas and other protected territories:
 Belfountain Conservation Area
 the Cheltenham Badlands
 Elora Cataract Trailway
 Island Lake Conservation Area
 Ken Whillans Resource Management Area
 Limehouse Conservation Area
 Meadowvale Conservation Area
 Rattray Marsh Conservation Area
 Silver Creek Conservation Area
 Terra Cotta Conservation Area
 Upper Credit Conservation Area

Activities
CVC is actively engaged in water management. The average daily flow of the Credit River is 690,000 cubic metres, 65% of which comes from groundwater. An estimated 750,000 residents in the Credit River Watershed, 87% of whom live in the lower third of the watershed, in present-day Mississauga and Brampton. In 1999, 21% of the watershed was developed, and by 2020, 40% of the watershed will be developed (based on approved development and the official plans of the municipalities).

See also
Conservation Authority
Mississauga
Credit River

References

External links
Credit Valley Conservation

 
Credit River
Conservation authorities in Ontario
1954 establishments in Ontario
Regional Municipality of Peel